Lincoln High School was a public high school in the Canton City School District from 1926 until 1976.  

The Lincoln Lions were members of the Hall of Fame Conference for football.

Due to low enrollment, Lincoln and Lehman High School were closed as traditional high schools at the end of the 1975-76 school year and became junior highs.  The Lincoln building would eventually house Heritage Christian School in 1979.

Notable alumni

 Don Nehlen – Coach: Head football; became head football coach at West Virginia University, College Football Hall of Fame inductee
 Dave Wottle (born August 7, 1950) gold medal - 800 meter run at the 1972 Summer Olympics

References

External links
Canton Lincoln Alumni Page
Old Ohio Schools' photographs of the building
Pre-Federal League History, Hoover Vikings Football

Defunct schools in Ohio
Educational institutions established in 1926
Educational institutions disestablished in 1976
1926 establishments in Ohio
1976 disestablishments in Ohio